Events from the year 1980 in Sweden

Incumbents
 Monarch – Carl XVI Gustaf
 Prime Minister – Thorbjörn Fälldin

Events
23 March – Nuclear power referendum
The Right Livelihood Award established

Popular culture

Literature
Vredens barn, novel by Sara Lidman

Sport
The 1980 European Figure Skating Championships were held in Gothenburg
The FIS Nordic World Ski Championships took place in Falun

Births

5 January – Elin Nordegren, model
10 March – Claire Hedenskog, swimmer.
13 June – Linda Wessberg, golf player
30 June – Emil Almén, actor
19 August – Tove Fraurud, politician
14 November – Johanna Thydell, writer
22 November – Emma Ejwertz, singer and songwriter

Deaths
17 February – Einar Karlsson, wrestler (born 1908)
26 October – Per-Olof Östrand, swimmer (born 1930)
17 November – Hans Wetterström, sprint canoer.

References

 
Sweden
Years of the 20th century in Sweden